Ashfaque Nipun is a Bangladeshi Filmmaker, Screenwriter and Actor known for directing Mohanagar, Mukim Brothers, Ei Shohore, Landphone er dingulite prem, Alpona Kajol, Sonali Danar Chil, Ms Shuily, Mukh o Mukhosh er golpo, Victim and Eti Maa.

His first breakout hit was TV series Mukim Brothers in 2010. After that, he made some good TV dramas, television films (telefilm), web film and web series. In early of his career, he also worked as an actor. Upashanghar, Un-manush, First Date and Middleclass sentiment are some of his notable works as an Actor. He won the prestigious 'Meril Prothom Alo Jury Awards' thrice, two for Best Screenplay writer for his telefilms 'Dondo Shomash' (2017), 'Ei Shohore' (2019) and one for Best Director for his first web series 'Mohanagar' (2021). 'Mohanagar', his first web series also fetched him three more awards too; One for Best Director in 'Channel i digital awards' and two for 'Hoichoi awards' for Best Directing and Most watched series of the year 2021. 'Mohanagar' was a smashing hit in both Bangladesh and India, and is considered one of the cult shows coming out from "Hoichoi". He made another web series for the same platform titled 'Sabrina' in 2022 and affirmed his position as one of the most important Show Creators from Bangladesh.

Early life 
Ashfaque Nipun is the eldest son of Mohammad Alauddin and Kazi Rokeya Begum. He was born and raised in Chittagong. His father was an electrical engineer and worked as an expatriate in Abu Dhabi, that's why a portion of Ashfaque Nipun's childhood was spent there. His father died when he was studying in class eight. He has a younger brother.

Career 
In 2002, Ashfaque Nipun joined a workshop on filmmaking hosted by Anisul Haque and Mostofa Sarwar Farooki at Chittagong Film Centre. This workshop inspired him to be a storyteller. Later, he moved to Dhaka from Chittagong to build a career in entertainment industry. And he started his career as an assistant director of Mostofa Sarwar Farooki. In 2006, he made his debut on television in the drama 2 In 1 as a director and an actor. In 2007, he acted on another drama called Uposhonghar co-starred Nafiza Jahan and directed by Mostofa Sarwar Farooki aired on Channel i as part of their Pahela Baishakh's special programs. In 2010, his television series Mukim Brothers aired on Channel i.  On 15 January 2021, his web film Koshtoneer premiered on Hoichoi. On 25 June 2021, His most acclaimed work Mohanagar also premiered on Hoichoi.

Personal life 
Ashfaque Nipun is married to Elita Karim. This couple first met in 2010 in the premiere of Mukim Brothers. And they got married in May 2015.

Filmmaking 
Nipun prefers to work with the taboo and sensitive subjects of the society. He never fears to bring out and tell the political corruption happening through his stories. In his works, he tries to show people that part of the society which they are afraid to acknowledge.

Significant Works

Television & Web Series

Television & Web Films

Television dramas

As an actor

Awards and nominations

References

External links 
 

Living people
Web series directors
Bangladeshi film directors
Bangladeshi television directors
Bangladeshi male writers
1980 births
People from Chittagong District